Stefanie Dehnen (born 31 May 1969) is a German chemist. She is the executive director of the Institute of Nanotechnology at the Karlsruhe Institute of Technology. From 2006 to 2022, she was a full professor for inorganic chemistry at the University of Marburg. She has received numerous awards for her research in inorganic chemistry.

Education and professional life 
Dehnen studied Chemistry at the University of Karlsruhe from 1988 to 1993. She finished her doctoral degree in Chemistry in the group of Dieter Fenske in 1996 and she completed her habilitation at the University of Karlsruhe in 2004. She was a full professor for inorganic chemistry at the University of Marburg from 2006 to 2022. Since October 2022, she is the executive director of the Institute of Nanotechnology at the Karlsruhe Institute of Technology. Since 2022, she is also Editor in Chief of the Journal Inorganic Chemistry (journal).

Personal life
She is married and has 4 children.

Research 
Her research focuses on the synthesis, the formation mechanisms, the stability, the reactivity, and the physical properties of compounds and materials with binary and ternary chalcogenidometalate anions, organotetrel chalcogenide compounds, binary Zintl anions and ternary intermetalloid clusters.

Three of her most-cited publications are:

Awards 
She has been awarded the Wöhler Young Scientists Award of the Society of German Chemists in 2004 and the State of Baden-Württemberg Teaching Award in 2005. Since 2016, Dehnen is a full member of the Göttingen Academy of Sciences and Humanities and the Mainz Academy of Sciences and Literature. In 2018, she was awarded the Philipps-Universität Marburg Award for Support of Women in Science of the University of Marburg. As the third woman (after Margot Becke and Marianne Baudler), she was awarded the Alfred Stock Memorial Prize in 2020. Moreover, she will give the Margot Becke lecture in 2020. In 2020 Stefanie Dehnen was accepted as a member of the National Academy of Sciences Leopoldina in the Chemistry Section. In 2022, she received the Gottfried Wilhelm Leibniz Prize and an ERC Advanced Grant for research into bismuth clusters. Since 2022, she is also a member of the Berlin-Brandenburg Academy of Sciences and Humanities.

References

External links
 

Living people
20th-century German chemists
German women chemists
1969 births
Karlsruhe Institute of Technology alumni
Academic staff of the University of Marburg
Members of the German Academy of Sciences Leopoldina
21st-century German chemists